

Arshavir II Kamsarakan was an Armenian prince from the Kamsarakan family. He was the son of Gazavon II, who immigrated to Sasanian-controlled Armenia following the Roman annexation of the western part of historic Armenia. Arshavir II is notable for having taken part in the anti-Sasanian revolt of 451, led by his father-in-law Vardan Mamikonian. He later died about 460. He was succeeded by his son Narses, who later took part in the insurrection of 482 to 484, led by Vardan's nephew Vahan Mamikonian.

References

Bibliography

Ancient works 
 Ghazar Parpetsi, History of the Armenians.

Modern works 
 
 
 

Kamsarakan family
5th-century Armenian people
Armenian people from the Sasanian Empire
Rebellions against the Sasanian Empire
460 deaths
Year of birth unknown